The Irish League in season 2000–01 comprised two divisions of 10 teams each, and Linfield won the championship.

Premier Division

League standings

Results

Matches 1–18

Matches 19–36

First Division

League standings

References
Northern Ireland - List of final tables (RSSSF)

NIFL Premiership seasons
1
Northern